Ebanda Manfred (December 2, 1935 – September 3, 2003) was a Cameroonian makossa singer. He is also composer of the hit song "Amie" later made famous by Bébé Manga.

Early life
Ebanda Manfred was born in Bali, Douala, Cameroon to Mr. Dooh Ebanda and Naéémy Matheo. After obtaining the CPCE in 1952 at Public School of Bonapriso, he continued his studies in Ebolowa and the Technical College of Douala, where he obtained the CAP in 1957.

Rise to Stardom
In 1960, Ebanda, age 24, falls in love with a young schoolgirl in Yaoundé. Friend Brigitte Essomba, Unmarried teen mother, left school to care for her child while still in the first cycle of secondary education. Ebanda Manfred expressed his feelings to her, she says she can not engage in a love story as it has not weaned her baby. Finding long wait - especially since the following year he returned to Douala - Ebanda Manfred sings his despair: "Friend, njika bunya so mo, mo o oa my Dube no, na na mba tondi oa?". Translation: "Friend, will you believe when finally my love ?". The song " Amié" is born, and composer then one year of experience in music.
The problem was that she was married but this song has caused a lot of trouble of him. Whenever he heard this song, her husband beat her to the point that eventually it burst a look. She subsequently divorced and remarried. She still lives, "says Manfred Ebanda which meanwhile has found Villa Vienne, his first wife, soul mate and companion of music.

Career
In 1961, Manfred Ebanda arrives in Douala and integrates "Rhythmic band" with fire Nelle Eyoum. It was while he was in this group that recorded " friend" on the radio in 1962. He did not even think to declare the song to a company copyrights. From the year of registration, the Ball begins again. The kickoff is given by Francis Bebey who released a record, in Europe, in which he plays "friend". Four years later, it's another makossa singer Paul Ebeny, which records in France. At this designer rhythm Makossa, he was awarded the first prize for the best song of the Reunification in 1971 in Cameroon Radio. Ebanda worked with his wife Villa, until their divorce in 1978.

In 1980, Bebe Manga actually recorded an adaptation of "Amie" which propels the front of the international music scene and allows him to receive the " Golden Maracas " SACEM. The same year, André astasia, a West Indian, the lot under " Alimony ". In 1982, Henri Salvador 's turn to enter the dance of times of " friend " and follow Nayanka Bell, Manu Dibango and Papa Wemba, Monique Seka, Jackie Biho, Bisso na Bisso, Bebe Manga, and others. His latest album, " Lolo ", released in 1989, Manfred Ebanda to his credit - a duet with his ex-wife, Villa Vienne - 7 " 45s " and 4 " 33 rpm ".

Death
On August 29, 2003. He was immediately taken to hospital Bonassama, in Douala. After receiving care, Ebanda Manfred returned home to Bodjongo. But his condition worsened, and he was brought to the Ad Lucem Hospital suffering further complications. The diagnosis revealed that his condition required surgery. Ebanda Manfred died on September 3, 2003, in Douala a few minutes before having surgery due to stomach pains. He was interred on September 13, 2003, in Bojongo, Douala, Cameroon.

Legacy
Amie is not the only one that has been taken. Other compositions of the singer as " Enoumedi ", " Baby na granny ", " Djongwanè lam " or " Ballad Bantu " have also been. But friend is the only one that has been a worldwide success. The only Cameroonian song, perhaps, that has nothing to envy " Guantanamera ", the other tube that has not finished running the world.

Discography
Albums
1981: Sister Muna
1983: Manfred Ebanda
1989: Lolo

References

1935 births
2003 deaths
20th-century Cameroonian male singers